Lincoln Township is a township in Dallas County, Iowa, USA.  As of the 2000 census, its population was 255.

Geography
According to the USGS, it contains one cemetery, Pleasant Hill.

References
 USGS Geographic Names Information System (GNIS)

External links
 US-Counties.com
 City-Data.com

Townships in Dallas County, Iowa
Townships in Iowa